Political Behavior is a quarterly peer-reviewed academic journal published by Springer Science+Business Media covering political behavior, institutions, processes and policies. The editors-in-chief are Geoffrey Layman and Benjamin Radcliff, both of the University of Notre Dame.

Abstracting and indexing 

According to the Journal Citation Reports, the journal has a 2020 impact factor of 6.172.

See also 
 List of political science journals

References

External links 
 

English-language journals
Political science journals
Publications established in 1979
Quarterly journals
Springer Science+Business Media academic journals